Aubrey Porter was one of the two MPs for Bury St Edmunds between 1705 and 1717.

References

Porter